Hazerswoude-Dorp is a village in the west of the Netherlands. It is located in the municipality of Alphen aan den Rijn,  South Holland, about 7 km southwest of the town of Alphen aan den Rijn.

Hazerswoude-Dorp is a peat excavation settlement which developed in the Middle Ages. It turned into a linear settlement along the dike on the Oude Rijn. A circular canal was dug around the view to prevent a prolapse of the village.

The Dutch Reformed church is a single aisled cruciform church. The tower dates from 1646 as a replacement of its medieval predecessor. The church itself was built in 1658.

Gallery

Famous residents

 Tom Okker (born 1944), Dutch tennis player; world # 3; now art dealer

References

Populated places in South Holland
Alphen aan den Rijn